This is the electoral history of Franklin D. Roosevelt, who served as the 32nd president of the United States (1933–1945) and the 44th governor of New York (1929–1932).

A member of the Democratic Party, Roosevelt was first elected to the New York State Senate in 1910, representing the 26th district. He won re-election in 1912 before resigning shortly after starting his second term to accept the position of Assistant Secretary of the Navy under President Woodrow Wilson. He served throughout World War I, then resigned in 1920 to run for Vice President of the United States as a part of James M. Cox's campaign. They would lose in a landslide to the Republican ticket of Warren G. Harding and Calvin Coolidge. After a break from electoral politics following his polio diagnosis, Roosevelt made his political comeback when he was narrowly elected Governor of New York in the 1928 election. His handling of the Great Depression in the state allowed him to win re-election by a much wider margin in 1930.

Roosevelt re-entered national politics when he announced his bid for the presidency in the 1932 election. After securing the Democratic nomination, he unseated incumbent President Herbert Hoover, becoming the first Democrat to win an outright majority of the popular vote since Samuel J. Tilden in 1876 and effectively jumpstarting the Fifth Party System. His re-election in 1936 was the greatest electoral landslide since the largely uncontested 1820 election, receiving the highest percentage of the electoral vote won by any candidate since then. He became the first and only president to win an unprecedented third and fourth terms in 1940 and 1944, in which he continued to enjoy relatively comfortable margins of victory due to his favorable handling of World War II and the persisting popularity of the New Deal. Roosevelt would die in office less than three months into his fourth term, being succeeded by Vice President Harry S. Truman.

New York State Senate elections (1910–1912)

1910

1912

United States Senate election (1914)

Primary election

Vice presidential campaign (1920)

Nomination

General election

New York gubernatorial elections (1928–1930)

1928

1930

Presidential elections (1932–1944)

1932

Primary elections

Nomination

General election

1936

Primary elections

Nomination

General election

1940

Primary elections

Nomination

General election

1944

Primary elections

Nomination

General election

Notes

References

Franklin D. Roosevelt
Roosevelt, Franklin D.
Roosevelt, Franklin D.